Little Canfield is a village and a civil parish in the Uttlesford district of Essex, England. The village is situated the B1256 road, near the A120 road and the village of Takeley.

Little Canfield is in the Takeley and the Canfields ward of Uttlesford, and the  Dunmow division of Essex County Council.

The village is currently expanding as housing developments are being built around the area. It has a public house, the Lion and Lamb.

See also 
 The Hundred Parishes

References

External links 

"Listed Buildings in Little Canfield, Essex, England", British Listed Buildings
"Little Canfield", Recordinguttlesfordhistory.org.uk, United Kingdom Individual registrant web site

Villages in Essex
Uttlesford
Civil parishes in Essex